Copelatus fernandensis is a species of diving beetle. It is part of the genus Copelatus of the subfamily Copelatinae in the family Dytiscidae. It was described by Félix Guignot in 1952.

References

fernandensis
Beetles described in 1952